Against Their Will may refer to:

 Against Their Will (Polyan book), a research book, Against Their Will... The History and Geography of Forced Migrations in the USSR by Pavel Polyan
 Against Their Will (Hornblum's book), a research book,  Against Their Will: The Secret History of Medical Experimentation on Children in Cold War America by Allen M. Hornblum
Against Their Will: Women in Prison, a 1994 TV movie by Judith Light
Against Their Will, a 2002 Winston-Salem Journal documentary about eugenics in North Carolina
Against Their Will, the English title of the 2012 French movie fr:Malgré-elles of two girls' struggles during the second world war